The 1928 Northern Illinois State Teachers football team represented Northern Illinois State Teachers College as a member of the Illinois Intercollegiate Athletic Conference during the 1928 college football season. Led by third-year head coach Roland Cowell, the Teachers compiled an overall record of 0–6–1 record with a mark of 0–2–1 record in conference play, tying for 19th place in the IIAC. Northern Illinois State played home games at Glidden Field, located on the east end of campus in DeKalb, Illinois. Leslie Hedberg was the team's captain.

Schedule

References

Northern Illinois State
Northern Illinois Huskies football seasons
Northern Illinois State Teachers football